The 65th Regiment Indiana Infantry, was organized in Princeton and recruited throughout the southern Indiana counties to fight in the American Civil War.

Organization

Regimental commanders

Regimental units
  Company A - Men primarily recruited from  Gibson and Posey counties
  Company B - Men primarily recruited from Gibson County
  Company C - Men primarily recruited from Knox County
  Company D - Men primarily recruited from Spencer County
  Company E - Men primarily recruited from Warrick County
  Company F - Men primarily recruited from Martin County
  Company G - Men primarily recruited from Gibson, Pike and Posey counties
  Company H - Men primarily recruited from Vanderburgh and Warrick counties
  Company I - Men primarily recruited from Daviess County
  Company K - Men primarily recruited from Dubois County

Command structure

Service

Strength
Original recruitment strength was 942 with 228 additional troops; total, 1,170. Regiment lost during service 34 Enlisted men killed and mortally wounded and 4 Officers and 216 Enlisted men by disease. Total 254, Additionally, 59 desertions and 8 unaccounted.

See also
 List of Indiana Civil War regiments

References

 Dyer, Frederick Henry. A Compendium of the War of the Rebellion, Des Moines: Dyer Publishing Co. 1908.
 Report of the Adjutant General of the State of Indiana, Volume 2, by W.H.H. Terrell, Adjutant General, Indiana, 1865
 Report of the Adjutant General of the State of Indiana, Volume 6, by W.H.H. Terrell, Adjutant General, Indiana, 1866
 "The Union Army" by Federal Publishing Company, 1908 - Volume 3

External links
  National Park Service – Regiment Details – Union Indiana Volunteers – 65th Regiment, Indiana Infantry
  The Civil War Archive:  Union Regimental Histories – Indiana – 65th Regiment Infantry
  Civil War Index:  65th Indiana Infantry in the American Civil War
  Family Search:  65th Regiment, Indiana Infantry

65 inf
Military units and formations established in 1862
1862 establishments in Indiana
Military units and formations disestablished in 1865